Piece of Paradise is a pop rock album released by the Canadian band Sky on Feb. 2, 1999 in Canada.

Its original Canadian release was slated for October 1998 before EMI Music Canada pushed it into the next year to avoid the Christmas rush.

The album was later released in various other versions in North America and elsewhere.

The U.S. version, released  on June 29, 1999 by Arista Records with an alternate blue cover, removes tracks "Powder" and "Last Time I Saw You" from the original version. It also adds two new tracks, "Dreamin'" and "Strange."

A second Canadian version was issued in 1999 which included all 12 tracks from both versions, with "Strange" and "Dreamin'" added as the final two songs. This is the version widely available on streaming platforms.

Track listing (Original Canadian Release)

 "Push" - 4:31
 "You And I" 3:43
 "Shave" - 4:39
 "Some Kinda Wonderful" - 3:46
 "I Will Survive" - 4:39
 "America" - 3:08
 "Powder" - 4:43
 "Love Song" - 3:35
 "All I Want" - 3:30
 "Last Time I Saw You" - 3:32

Track listing (1999 U.S. Release - Blue Cover)

 "Love Song" - 3:35
 "Push" - 4:31
 "Strange" - 4:28
 "Dreamin'" - 3:38
 "America" - 3:08
 "All I Want" - 3:30
 "Some Kinda Wonderful" - 3:46
 "You and I" - 3:43
 "Shave" - 4:39
 "I Will Survive" (Dino Fekaris, Freddie Perren) - 4:39

Chart performance

Album

References

1999 debut albums
Sky (Canadian band) albums
Arista Records albums
1998 debut albums